The Falcons is a 1970 Hungarian film directed by István Gaál about the training of falcons for use on farms to protect crops from birds. It is based on the 1967 novel by Miklós Mészöly. It won the Jury Prize at the 1970 Cannes Film Festival, tying with The Strawberry Statement.

Cast
 Ivan Andonov - Fiú
 György Bánffy - Lilik
 Gyula Bay
 Gyula Gulyás
 Gábor Harsányi
 Pál Hriazik
 Péter Kertész
 Judit Meszléry - Teréz
 Gábor Nadai
 Sándor Nagy
 Mihály Nyúl
 Ferenc Paláncz
 József Zémann

References

External links 
 

1970 films
1970s Hungarian-language films
1970 drama films
Films directed by István Gaál
Films about birds
Hungarian drama films